Andrew William Monkhouse (born 23 October 1980) is an English former professional footballer who played as a winger.

He has previously played for Rotherham United, Swindon Town, Hartlepool United, Bristol Rovers, Grimsby Town, Alfreton Town and Whitby Town.

Club career

Rotherham United
Born in Leeds, West Yorkshire, Monkhouse began his career with Rotherham United as a trainee before rising to the senior ranks at the age of 18 and scored on his debut in a 3–0 win against Hartlepool United.

After 128 league outings for Rotherham and a couple of long-term injuries, in May 2006 Monkhouse was released.

Swindon Town
Monkhouse became Dennis Wise's first signing as manager of Swindon Town on 22 June 2006, signing a one-year contract.

Hartlepool United
Monkhouse's time at Swindon was interrupted by injury and he was loaned to Hartlepool United. Following a successful loan spell, a deal was then agreed between Swindon and Hartlepool United on 10 January 2007. Remarkably, the first time he was on the losing side in a league match in 2006–07 was in United's defeat against Barnet on 7 April 2007.

Monkhouse was named in the PFA League Two Team of the Year for the 2006–07 season after Hartlepool went on to finish 2nd to secure promotion to League One.

After playing in a 1–0 win against Sheffield United in the Football League Trophy in October 2013, Monkhouse made his 300th appearance for Hartlepool in all competitions, which made him one of only 16 'Pools' players to do so.

Monkhouse was released in May 2014, ending a seven-year stay with the 'Pools'. He played in 331 games in all competitions for the North-East and is currently thirteenth in Hartlepool's all-time appearances list.

Bristol Rovers
On 21 July 2014, Monkhouse signed for Bristol Rovers on a one-year deal after being released by Hartlepool United. He helped the club earn an instant return to the Football League, being a part of the team that gained promotion by winning the 2015 Conference Premier play-off Final.

Monkhouse left the club on completion of his contract as he sought a club closer to his Leeds home.

Grimsby Town
On 24 June 2015, Monkhouse signed for Conference National side Grimsby Town on a one-year deal.

Monkhouse was a regular player in the squad that eventually gained promotion with Grimsby's 3–1 victory over Forest Green Rovers in the 2016 National League play-off Final at Wembley, seeing Grimsby promoted to League Two after a six-year absence from the Football League. Monkhouse was released when his contract expired at the end of the season.

Non-League
Monkhouse signed for National League North side Alfreton Town upon his release from Grimsby. He scored 6 times in 46 appearances as Town narrowly avoided relegation. In February 2017, Monkhouse took up the role as Alfreton's player/assistant manager.

On 7 July 2017, he signed a one-year deal with Northern Premier League side Whitby Town. Monkhouse played at centre-half for Whitby and made 52 appearances for the club. Monkhouse, however, only played on part-time during his stay at the club, because he also was working at the Leeds City College as a football coach.

Coaching career
In November 2018, Monkhouse transferred to Northern Premier League Division One side Ossett United to move closer to his home and focus more on coaching as he moved into a player/coach role. Monkhouse already had a UEFA A Licence and was also the U18 head coach of Ossett until May 2020. He also worked at the academy of Rotherham United (July 2018 to September 2019). When he stepped down from this position, he worked one year in a similar position at Barnsley (September 2019 to May 2020).

In January 2020, Monkhouse signed a player-deal with Tadcaster Albion. On 17 April 2020, Monkhouse was appointed head coach of Pontefract Collieries. On 18 January 2021, Monkhouse left Pontefract Collieries by mutual consent.

In September 2021, Monkhouse was appointed assistant first-team coach of Tadcaster Albion.

Career statistics

Honours

Player
Rotherham United
Second Division runner-up: 2000–01
Third Division runner-up: 1999–2000

Swindon Town
League Two promotion: 2006–07

Hartlepool United
League Two runner-up: 2006–07

Bristol Rovers
Conference Premier play-offs: 2015

Grimsby Town
National League play-offs: 2016
FA Trophy runner-up: 2015–16

Individual
PFA Team of the Year: 2006–07 League Two

References

External links

Andy Monkhouse profile at In The Mad Crowd

Living people
1980 births
Footballers from Leeds
English footballers
Rotherham United F.C. players
Swindon Town F.C. players
Hartlepool United F.C. players
Bristol Rovers F.C. players
Grimsby Town F.C. players
Alfreton Town F.C. players
Whitby Town F.C. players
Ossett United F.C. players
Tadcaster Albion A.F.C. players
English Football League players
National League (English football) players
Association football wingers
English football managers
Pontefract Collieries F.C. managers
Northern Premier League managers